Natalie Ann Yepez, better known by her stage name Maluca, grew up in Washington Heights, Manhattan. Raised on a steady diet of bachata, cumbia, merengue, and mambo, as well as hip-hop and other club music, Maluca's music has been described as "experimental tropical punk, ghetto tech, and hip-house". Although a bad case of stage fright kept her out of the spotlight for much of her life, a chance meeting with Diplo while performing karaoke eventually led to "El Tigeraso", Maluca's first single.

The years 2009 and 2010 saw her touring, performing, and releasing what she calls "tropical punk" tracks. Since the release of her single in 2009, Maluca has recorded tracks that range from merengue mashups to kuduro to old-school deep house and focused on her stage show, which includes two dancers named the Cookies. China Food is her latest release as she prepares for a second visit to South by South West.

The name Maluca in Spanish is a derivative of Mala which means bad or mean girl. In Portuguese Maluca means a crazy or mischievous girl.

Discography

EPs

Singles

As lead artist

As featured artist

References

http://tmagazine.blogs.nytimes.com/2011/02/26/maluca-mala-la-crazy-bad/?ref=t-magazine

External links
 malucamala.com Official site
 Maluca on Soundcloud

1983 births
Living people
American electronic musicians
American women pop singers
American dance musicians
American women singer-songwriters
Singer-songwriters from New York (state)
Spanish-language singers of the United States
21st-century American women singers
21st-century American singers